PM2FGU, on-air name Gen FM or Gen 98.7 FM, is a contemporary hit radio in Jakarta. Gen FM plays around 80% Western Top 40 music and 20% Indonesian Top 40 music.

History 
The 98.7 FM frequency in Jakarta used to be an Islamic radio station called Er Radio or FMuslim. This channel was popular for Quran recital via phone call. In 2000, this frequency becomes vacant. In the same year, Mahaka Radio Integra (MARI) acquired this station after rebranding of Radio One Jakarta into 101 Jak FM.

The format pushed International Top 40 song, creating rivalry to 88.0 Mustang FM, all 80% Indonesian song radio, and peaking the radio station ranking. New programming and professional DJ recruiting, especially DJs from 2000's, paved Gen FM's way into number 1 radio in Jakarta.

List of slogan 
As Attahiriyah FMuslim
 Voice Of Moslem (1 January 1989-31 July 2000)
 Radio Keluarga Muslim (Family Moslem Radio, 1 July 1998-31 July 2000)

As Gen FM
 Pilihan Terbaik (The Best Choice) (2000-present)

Network 
Gen FM has a network in Surabaya, called Gen 103.1 FM Surabaya (PM6FKC). No relayed programs from Gen FM Jakarta in Gen FM Surabaya.

References

Radio stations in Jakarta
Mahaka Media

id:Gen FM
jv:Gen FM